Francisco Sebastián "Sebas" Moyano Jiménez (born 23 March 1997) is a Spanish footballer who plays as an attacking midfielder for CD Lugo.

Club career
Born in Villanueva del Duque, Córdoba, Andalusia, Moyano joined Córdoba CF in 2012, after already making his senior debut with CD Villanueva del Duque. He made his debut for the former's reserves on 1 September 2013, starting in a 0–0 Segunda División B away draw against UD Almería B.

Moyano scored a career-best 19 goals during the 2015–16 season, but suffered a knee injury which took him out of the ensuing promotion play-offs. On 18 March 2017 he made his professional debut, coming on as a second-half substitute for Antoñito in a 0–0 home draw against CD Numancia in the Segunda División.

On 9 July 2018, Moyano signed a new three-year deal with the Blanquiverdes. He scored his first professional goal on 16 October, netting his team's last through an individual effort in a 4–1 away routing of Elche CF, in the season's Copa del Rey.

On 31 January 2019, after being sparingly used, Moyano was loaned to third division side Valencia CF Mestalla, for six months. Upon returning, he was assigned to the main squad now also in division three, but returned to Valencia B on loan exactly one year later.

On 7 September 2020, free agent Moyano agreed to a three-year contract with CD Lugo in the second division. On 11 November, however, he was loaned to third tier side CD Ebro as he was not registered on time by his parent club.

References

External links

1997 births
Living people
Sportspeople from the Province of Córdoba (Spain)
Spanish footballers
Footballers from Andalusia
Association football midfielders
Segunda División players
Segunda División B players
Tercera División players
Divisiones Regionales de Fútbol players
Córdoba CF B players
Córdoba CF players
Valencia CF Mestalla footballers
CD Lugo players
CD Ebro players
Spain youth international footballers